Sarmizegetusa Regia, also Sarmisegetusa, Sarmisegethusa, Sarmisegethuza, Ζαρμιζεγεθούσα (Zarmizegethoúsa) or Ζερμιζεγεθούση (Zermizegethoúsē), was the capital and the most important military, religious and political centre of the Dacians before the wars with the Roman Empire. Erected on top of a 1200 m high mountain, the fortress, comprising six citadels, was the core of a strategic defensive system in the Orăștie Mountains (in present-day Romania).

Sarmizegetusa Regia should not be confused with Ulpia Traiana Sarmizegetusa, the Roman capital of Dacia built by Roman Emperor Trajan some 40 km away, which was not the Dacian capital. Sarmizegetusa Ulpia was discovered earlier, was known already in the early 1900s, and was initially mistaken for the Dacian capital, a confusion which led to incorrect conclusions being made regarding the military history and organization of the Dacians.

Etymology 
Several hypotheses have been advanced to explain the origin of the name Sarmizegetusa. The most important of these ascribe the following possible meanings to the city's name:

 ‘Citadel built of palisades on a mountain peak’ from zermi (*gher-mi ‘mountain peak, top’, cf. *gher ‘stone; high’) and zeget (*geg(H)t)
 ‘City of the warm river’ from zarmi ‘warm’ (cognate with Sanskrit gharma  ‘warm’) and  zeget ‘flow’ (cognate with Sanskrit sarj- in  sarjana- ‘flow’ and Bactrian harez- in harezâna ‘id.’), the city being named after the nearby river Sargetia
 ‘Palace illuminating the world of life’ from zaryma ‘palace’ (cf. Sanskrit harmya ‘palace’), zegeth ‘world of life’ (cf. Sanskrit jagat- ‘go’,  and jigat- ‘mobility; world of life’) and usa ‘illuminating, enlightening; burning’)

Layout 

Sarmizegetusa Regia contained a citadel and residential areas with dwellings and workshops as well as a sacred zone.
 The fortress, a quadrilateral formed by massive stone blocks (murus dacicus), was constructed on five terraces, on an area of almost 30,000 m².
 The sacred zone — among the most important and largest circular and rectangular Dacian sanctuaries – includes a number of rectangular temples, the bases of their supporting columns still visible in regular arrays. Perhaps the most enigmatic construction at the site is the large circular sanctuary. It consisted of a setting of timber posts in the shape of a D, surrounded by a timber circle which in turn was surrounded by a low stone kerb. The layout of the timber settings bears some resemblance to the stone monument at Stonehenge in England.
 An artifact referred to as the “Andesite Sun" seems to have been used as a sundial. Since it is known that Dacian culture was influenced by contact with Hellenisitic Greece, the sundial may have resulted from the Dacians' exposure to Hellenistic learning in geometry and astronomy.
 Civilians lived below the citadel itself in settlements built on artificial terraces, such as the one at Feţele Albe. A system of ceramic pipes channeled running water into the residences of the nobility.

The archaeological inventory found at the site demonstrates that Dacian society had a relatively high standard of living.

History

Variants of the name of the city

Historical records show considerable variation in the spelling of the name of the Dacian capital:

 Zarmigethusa, Sarmisegethusa (Ptolemy, Geography, 2nd century AD)
 Zermizegethusa (Dio Cassius 2nd-3rd century)
 Sarmazege (Anonymous Geographer from Ravenna, around 700 AD)
 Sarmategte (Tabula Peutingeriana, 13th century)
 Zarmizegetusa and Sarmizegetusa (from inscriptions)
 Sargetia (name of the river nearby)

Pre-Roman era 
Towards the end of his reign, Burebista transferred the Geto-Dacian capital from Argedava to Sarmizegetusa. Serving as the Dacian capital for at least one and a half centuries, Sarmizegethusa reached its zenith under King Decebal. Archeological findings suggest that the Dacian god Zalmoxis and his chief priest had an important role in Dacian society at this time. They have also shed new light on the political, economic and scientific development of the Dacians and their successful assimilation of technical and scientific knowledge from the Greek and Romans.

The site has yielded two especially notable finds:
 A medical kit, in a brassbound wooden box with an iron handle, containing a scalpel, tweezers, powdered pumice and miniature pots for pharmaceuticals
  A huge vase, 24 in (0.6 m) high and 41 in (1.04 m) across, bearing an inscription in the Roman alphabet: DECEBAL PER SCORILO, i.e. ‘Decebalus, son (cf. Latin puer) of Scorilus’ 

The smithies north of the sanctuary also provide evidence of the Dacians' skill in metalworking: findings include tools such as metre-long tongs, hammers and anvils which were used to make some 400 metallic artefacts — scythes, sickles, hoes, rakes, picks, pruning hooks, knives, plowshares, and carpenters' tools  — as well as weapons such as daggers, curved Dacian scimitars, spearpoints, and shields.

Nevertheless, the flowering of Dacian civilization apparently underway during the reign of Decebalus came to an abrupt end when Trajan's legions destroyed the city and deported its population.

The defensive system 

The Dacian capital’s defensive system includes six Dacian fortresses — Sarmizegetusa, Costești-Blidaru, Piatra Roșie, Costești-Cetățuie, Căpâlna and Bănița.
All six have been named UNESCO World heritage sites.

Roman era 
Sarmizegetusa's walls were partly dismantled at the end of First Dacian war in AD 102, when Dacia was invaded by the Emperor Trajan of the Roman Empire and rebuilt as Roman fortifications. The latter were subsequently destroyed possibly by the Dacians and then rebuilt again following the successful siege of the site in AD 105–6.

The Roman conquerors established a military garrison at Sarmizegetusa Regia. Later, the capital of Roman Dacia was  established 40 km from the ruined Dacian capital, and was named after it - Colonia Ulpia Traiana Augusta Dacica Sarmizegetusa.

Gallery

See also 
 Ulpia Traiana Sarmizegetusa
 List of Dacian towns
 Decebalus
 Dacian Fortresses of the Orăștie Mountains 
 Seven Wonders of Romania

Notes

References 

 
 
 
 
 
 
 .

External links 

 Cetățile dacice din Munții Orăștiei - Sarmizegetusa Regia
 The Dacian Fortresses of the Orastie Mountains
 Virtual 3D Reconstruction of Sarmizegetusa Regia
 „Large circular sanctuary" from Sarmizegetusa Regia, 3D reconstruction (v.1)
 3D Reconstruction of Sarmizegetusa from Documentary "Decoding Dacia" by Kogainon Films
 

Plans, surveys
 „Plan TOPO 2D", 2D topographical plan of the archaeological site of Sarmizegetusa  Regia (v.1), source files .DWG, .PDF
 „Plan TOPO 3D", 3D topographical plan of the archaeological site of Sarmizegetusa Regia (v.2), source files .DWG, .PDF

3D reconstructions
 "Paved road" from Sarmizegetusa Regia, 3D reconstruction (v.1)
 "Great Round Temple" from Sarmizegetusa Regia, 3D reconstruction  (v.2), "Large circular sanctuary" from Sacred Area

Archaeological sites in Romania
Dacian towns
Former populated places in Eastern Europe
Dacian fortresses of the Orăștie Mountains
Dacian fortresses in Hunedoara County
Historic monuments in Hunedoara County
Tourist attractions in Hunedoara County
Ancient history of Transylvania